Freadelpha eremita is a species of beetle in the family Cerambycidae. It was described by John O. Westwood in 1845, originally under the genus Lamia. It has a wide distribution in Africa.

Subspecies
 Freadelpha eremita eremita (Westwood, 1845)
 Freadelpha eremita gabonensis Breuning, 1954

References

Sternotomini
Beetles described in 1845